Simon Zoller (born 26 June 1991) is a German professional footballer who plays as a striker for Bundesliga club VfL Bochum.

Career
Zoller began his career with Karlsruher SC, and made his debut for the club in November 2010, as a substitute for Patrick Dulleck in a 0–0 draw with VfL Osnabrück in the 2. Bundesliga. Karlsruhe were relegated to the 3. Liga at the end of the following season.

Zoller left the club, signing for VfL Osnabrück, along with teammates Marcus Piossek and Timo Staffeldt.

In June 2013, he signed a four-year contract with 2. Bundesliga side 1. FC Kaiserslautern.

A year later, after outstanding performances for Kaiserslautern, he signed for recently promoted Bundesliga side 1. FC Köln on a four-year deal. Köln had to pay a transfer fee of reportedly €3 million.

However, Zoller could not fulfill the high expectations during the first half of the 2014–15 campaign and returned subsequently in the winter break on loan to 1. FC Kaiserslautern for the remainder of the season. After an extended period of limited playing time in 2018, it was announced that Zoller would join VfL Bochum from January 2019.

Personal life
Zoller married television presenter Laura Wontorra on 12 November 2016. Laura is the daughter of journalist Jörg Wontorra.

Career statistics

References

External links

1991 births
Living people
People from Friedrichshafen
Sportspeople from Tübingen (region)
German footballers
Footballers from Baden-Württemberg
Association football forwards
Bundesliga players
2. Bundesliga players
3. Liga players
Karlsruher SC players
Karlsruher SC II players
VfL Osnabrück players
1. FC Kaiserslautern players
1. FC Köln players
VfL Bochum players